Abbé Aloïsius Édouard Camille Gaultier (Asti, 1745 or 1746 - Paris, 19 September 1818) was a French Roman Catholic priest and educational reformer. In 1792 he left France during the worst of the Revolution, passing via Holland to England where he set up a school for the children of other refugees.

He was a pioneer in getting children to learn through amusing them and was made  a member of the commission for the reorganization of public instruction.  He wrote a large number of books, such as Géographie de l'abbé Gaultier, that became popular as instructional books in Nineteenth Century France.

References

18th-century French Roman Catholic priests
19th-century French Roman Catholic priests
1740s births
1818 deaths